is a Japanese actress and voice actress from Tokyo, Japan. She voiced Nozomi Yumehara/Cure Dream in Yes! PreCure 5 and its sequel GoGo! and currently plays Boruto Uzumaki in Boruto: Naruto Next Generations.

Biography
Sanpei made her voice acting debut in the anime series UFO Baby. Initially, she was a second-year junior high school student, the same as the character. She voiced Renton Thurston in Eureka Seven became her first starring work. She was also the first main personality on the publicity radio with Kaori Nazuka.

In 2006, she played the first female role in the series Ouran High School Host Club as Shiori Ebisugawa and, in 2007, she voiced Nozomi Yumehara/Cure Dream in Yes! PreCure 5.

After leaving the theater company Wakakusa around May 2007, she went to Production Baobab on November 1 of the same year after a freelance period. In 2010, she joined the stage after a long time for the performance of Song of Joy.

On October 1, 2011, she left Production Baobab to transfer to the Axlone agency. On February 28, 2013, Sanpei announced on her blog that she was married. She also announced on the official blog that her first child was born on October 1, 2014.

In 2019, she won the Best Actress in a Leading Role at the 13th Seiyu Awards.

On July 5, she announced on her Twitter account that she had a second child.

On August 18, 2021, it was announced Sanpei tested positive for COVID-19.

Filmography

Anime television series
UFO Baby (2000), Kanata Saionji – debut role
Ojarumaru (2001), Hoshino (2nd voice), Rikie, Kazuko Endo
Galaxy Angel A (2002), Cocomo Perot
Di Gi Charat Nyo! (2003), Ponzu
Galaxy Angel AA (2003), Cocomo Perot
Nanaka 6/17 (2003), Nenji Nagihara (6 years old), Yūki
DearS (2004), Takeya Ikuhara (child)
Galaxy Angel X (2004), Cocomo Perot
Jubei-chan 2 ~The Counter Attack of Siberian Yagyu~ (2004), Jubei Yagyu (child)
School Rumble (2004), Shuuji Harima
Sweet Valerian (2004), Masao-kun
Eureka Seven (2005), Renton Thurston
Gyagu Manga Biyori (2005), Ramen Spirit
MÄR (2005), Choro
Mushishi (2005), Shinra Ioroi
Onegai My Melody (2005), Ryō Ōta
Aria the Natural (2006), Akatsuki Izumo (child)
D.Gray-man (2006), Jean Russell
Gintama (2006), Seita
Onegai My Melody: Kuru Kuru Shuffle! (2006), Ryō Ōta
Otogi-Jushi Akazukin (2006), Souta Suzukaze – 2nd voice
Ouran High School Host Club (2006), Shiori Ebisugawa
School Rumble Nigakki (2006), Shuuji Harima
Soreike! Anpanman (2006), Pink Shokupanman, Violin-kun
Shinseiki Duel Masters Flash (2006), Kasumi
Yume Tsukai (2006), Kentaro
Koisuru Tenshi Angelique: Kagayaki no Ashita (2007), Matt
Bokurano (2007), Yoko Machi
Darker than Black (2007), Maki
Hello Kitty Ringo no Mori to Parallel Town (2007), Henry
Les Misérables: Shōjo Cosette (2007), Paulette, Bressole
Myself ; Yourself (2007), Syusuke Wakatsuki (child)
Reborn! (2007), Fūta and Lavina
Sola (2007), Takeshi Tsujido (child)
Shakugan no Shana II (2007), Yuri Chvojka
Yes! PreCure 5 (2007), Nozomi Yumehara/Cure Dream (Speaking Voice in Civilian Form)
Blassreiter (2008), Joseph Jobson (10 years old)
Dazzle (2008), Elmer
Hell Girl: Three Vessels (2008), Kazuya Ichimura
Inazuma Eleven (2008), Terumi "Aphrodi" Afuro
Kaiba (2008), Copy Warp
Majin Tantei Nōgami Neuro (2008), Eri Hoshino

Yes! PreCure 5 Go Go! (2008), Nozomi Yumehara/Cure Dream
Xam'd: Lost Memories (2008), Nakiami
Natsu no Arashi! (2009), Hajime Yasaka
Fullmetal Alchemist: Brotherhood (2009), Selim Bradley/Pride
Kimi ni Todoke (2009), Chizuru Yoshida
Saki (2009), Kazue Nanpo
Seikon no Qwaser (2010), Alexander Nikolaevich Hell
Arakawa Under the Bridge (2010), Tetsuo
Metal Fight Beyblade (2010), Masamune Kadoya
Ikkitousen: Xtreme Xecutor (2010), Kansui Bun'yaku
Mitsudomoe (2010), Shinya Satou
Squid Girl (2010), Yūta Matsumoto
Strike Witches 2 (2010), Nishiki Nakajima
Tamagotchi! (2010), Melodytchi
Seikon no Qwaser II (2011), Alexander Nikolaevich Hell
Nekogami Yaoyorozu (2011), Gonta
Yu-Gi-Oh! Zexal (2011), Haruto Tenjo, Obomi
The Idolmaster (2011), Ryo Akizuki
Cross Fight B-Daman (2011), Ryuji Sumeragi
Aikatsu! (2012), Kakeru Ōta
Area no Kishi (2012), Kakeru Aizawa
Toriko (2012), Fond de Buono
Space Brothers (2012), Young Hibito NanbaDanchi Tomoo (2013), Tomoo KinoshitaHakkenden: Eight Dogs of the East (2013), KentaD-Frag! (2014), Azuma MatsubaraHero Bank (2014), Kaito GōshōMajin Bone (2014), GilbertPokémon: XY (2014), SanpeiAnti-Magic Academy: The 35th Test Platoon (2015), Isuka SuginamiKamisama Kiss◎ (2015), ShinjiroSnow White with the Red Hair (2015), RyuuMarch Comes in Like a Lion (2016), Harunobu Nikaidō (young)Nyanbo! (2016), KuroRin-ne (2016), ShomaSnow White with the Red Hair 2nd Season (2016), RyuuWorld Trigger (2016), Yuzuru EmaInuyashiki (2017), Takeshi InuyashikiBoruto: Naruto Next Generations (2017), Boruto UzumakiTsugumomo (2017), Kazuya KagamiGakuen Babysitters (2018), Taka Kamitani/Shizuka KamitaniCaptain Tsubasa (2018), Tsubasa OzoraInazuma Eleven: Ares no Tenbin (2018), Afuro "Aphrodi" TerumiNo Guns Life (2019), SevenAscendance of a Bookworm (2020), GilTsugu Tsugumomo (2020), Kazuya KagamiDigimon Adventure: (2020), Taichi YagamiYashahime: Princess Half-Demon (2020), JakotsumaruSummer Time Rendering (2022), Ryūnosuke MinakataUzaki-chan Wants to Hang Out! ω (2022), Kiri UzakiLegend of Mana: The Teardrop Crystal (2022), Bud

Original video animation (OVA)Alien Nine (Hiroshi Iwanami)Grrl Power (Akira)Hiyokoi (Natsuki Aizawa)My-Otome 0~S.ifr~ (Elliot Chandler)Majokko Tsukune-chan (Nabul, Mika Onigawara)

Original net animation (ONA)Pokémon: Twilight Wings (2020), HopDragon's Dogma (2020), LouisStar Wars: Visions - The Duel (2021), Village Chief

FilmDoraemon: Nobita no Himitsu Dōgu Museum (2013) as KurtPretty Cure All Stars Movie Series (Nozomi Yumehara/Cure Dream)Boruto: Naruto the Movie (Boruto Uzumaki)

Video gamesJoJo's Bizarre Adventure: All Star Battle (Narancia Ghirga)JoJo's Bizarre Adventure: Eyes of Heaven (Narancia Ghirga).hack//LINK (Tokio Kuryuu)Another Century's Episode 3 (Renton Thurston)Luminous Arc (Theo)Minna no Golf Portable 2 (Leo)Castlevania Judgment (Eric Lecarde)Fantasy Earth: Zero (Ella)Tales of Graces (young Richard)The Idolmaster Dearly Stars (Ryo Akizuki)Naruto Shippuden: Ultimate Ninja Storm 4 (Boruto Uzumaki)Super Robot Wars Z (Renton Thurston)Super Robot Wars Z: Special Disc (Renton Thurston)Hyperdimension Neptunia Mk2 (Kei Jinguji)Rune Factory 4 (Noel)
 Captain Tsubasa Zero: Miracle Shoot (Tsubasa Ozora)
Captain Tsubasa: Rise of New Champions (Tsubasa Ozora)Digimon Story: Cyber Sleuth – Hacker's Memory (Yu Nogi)Another Eden (Philo)Granblue Fantasy (Furias)Arknights (Aak)Atelier Lulua: The Scion of Arland (Chimdragon)Azur Lane (Jamaica)Yoon Yonghyeon (Sdorica)SinoAlice (Pinocchio)Valkyrie Connect (Dinavia)Genshin Impact, Mika

Dubbing roles
Live-actionAnna and the Apocalypse (Steph North (Sarah Swire))Awake (Diana (Francesca Eastwood))Cop Car (Harrison (Hays Wellford))FBI: Most Wanted (Sheryll Barnes (Roxy Sternberg))Ratter (Nicole (Rebecca Naomi Jones))Red Election (Beatrice Ogilvy (Lydia Leonard))

AnimationEl Tigre: The Adventures of Manny Rivera (Manny Rivera/El Tigre)Fly Me to the Moon (I.Q.)

References
 Nakagami, Yoshikatsu et al. "Voice Actress Spotlight". (June 2007) Newtype USA''. pp. 112–113.

External links
 
Yūko Sanpei at GamePlaza-Haruka Voice Acting Database 
Yūko Sanpei at Hitoshi Doi's Seiyuu Database
Yuuko Sanpei at Ryu's Seiyuu Infos

1986 births
Living people
Japanese video game actresses
Japanese voice actresses
Voice actresses from Tokyo
21st-century Japanese actresses